Chisbury is a hamlet and prehistoric hill fort in the civil parish of Little Bedwyn in Wiltshire, England.

History
Palaeolithic, Neolithic and Bronze Age artefacts have been found in the area, but the hillfort was most probably built in the late Iron Age in the 1st century AD. The hillfort was re-used in the Anglo-Saxon times as a burh, cited in the Burghal Hidage document which lists the fortifications of Wessex from that time.

St. Martin's chapel, on the eastern edge of the hillfort, seems to have been built in the early part of the 13th century. There are written records of it from 1246 onwards and its surviving architecture is contemporary with that period. The windows have the remains of good-quality tracery in a style that suggests they were made in the latter part of the 13th century. Between 1496 and 1518 St. Martin's lacked a priest, but it was served again from 1518 until 1547. Thereafter St. Martin's lapsed from use for worship and was turned into a barn. It was re-roofed in the 19th century but in 1998 its condition was semi-ruinous. The hillfort and chapel were designated as a scheduled ancient monument in 1925.

Chisbury Manor farmhouse, also within the hillfort site, is a two-storey brick building from the mid 18th century.

A blocked ogee-headed north window and the surround of the east window are the only surviving features. The farmhouse is a brick-built Georgian house of five bays dated 1735.

References

Sources and further reading

External links

Hamlets in Wiltshire
Hill forts in Wiltshire